Simon Delestre (born 21 June 1981) is a French equestrian. His specialty is show jumping, either individually or as part of a team. Delestre ranks twenty-five on the FEI Rolex Ranking List.

Personal life 
Simon Delestre was born 21 June 1981 in Metz, France, the son of Marcel Delestre. His father, a former international rider, got Delestre interested in equestrianism at a young age. Delestre tried many sports as a child, but a pony named Panama du Cassou HN gave him a taste for riding.

Delestre's stables are located in the structure of his parents Marcel and Magalis' home in Solgne.

Recently when asked if he had any hobbies, Delestre said "No time for that."

Career 
After obtaining a Bachelor of Science in 1999, Delestre was crowned the gold medalist at the France Junior Championships and continued that year to win bronze as part of a team in the European Junior Championships. The following year he won the gold medal with his team at the European Championship for Young Riders. Delestre then continued his career in both Pro and Pro Elite races, as well as international events such as the Nations Cup, CSI-5*, and the World Cup Circuit.

In 2011, Delestre was selected to be a reserve rider at the European Championships in Madrid, Spain, where the French team has won three silver medals. The same year, Delestre managed to qualify for the World Cup Final in Leipzig, Germany, where he ranked sixteenth with Couletto. At the end of 2011, Delestre manages to be in the Top Ten of the FEI Rolex Ranking List, allowing him to participate in the Final Top Ten IJRC of Paris. For that race, he finished eighth on Napoli du Ry. Delestre participated in two World Cup finals, where he got tenth in Stuttgart and fourth in Zurich. However, he failed to qualify for the finals in Hertogensbosch, Netherlands.

Delestre qualified for the 2012 London Olympics on Napoli du Ry, where his coach was Henk Nooren. He finished nineteenth in the individual jumping finals and was part of the French team for team jumping, which came in twelfth.

Delestre is perhaps best known for his prowess in the Mediterranean Games, where he has won two gold medals and one silver, both as part of a team and individually.

Placements 
 1999
Junior Champion of France in Fontainebleau with Bella de Charmois
Part of the bronze medal team at the European Junior Championships in Münchwilen, Switzerland with Eddy de Villiers
 2000
Part of the gold medal team at the European Championship for Young Riders in Hartpury, Great Britain with Didam de la Ressée
Winner of CSIOY Reims with Didam de la Ressée
 2001
Part of the fourth-place team at the European Championship for Young Riders in Gijon, Spain with Faraon de la Ressée
 2002
Part of the fifth-place team at the CSIO-4* Ebelsberg in Linz, Austria with Didam de la Ressée
Third place at the Grand Prix for CSIO-4* Ebelsberg in Linz, Austria with Didam de la Ressée
Winner of the Grand Prix for CSIOY in Lummen, Belgium with JPC Rexito Z
 2003
Seventh place at the Grand Prix for CSI-3* in Lons le Saunier with Hello Arcy
Winner of the small Grand Prix for CSI-3* in Vittel with Lucky Luck C
The Grand Prize Winner for Pro 1 in Montbéliard with Iceberg Forestry
 2004
Second place at the Grand Prix Pro in Palaiseau with Holga of Bignons
Second place at the Power Pro with Franconville Istar of Vesquerie
 2005
Winner of the Grand Prix for CSI-3* in Dunkirk with Unpublished Balme
Sixth place at the Grand Prix for CSI-3* in Bourge en Bresse with Unpublished Balme
Part of the silver medal team at the Mediterranean Games with Unpublished Balme
Eighth place individually at the Mediterranean Games with Unpublished Balme
 2006
Part of the winning team at CSIO-5* in Rome, Italy with Unpublished Balme
Part of the second-place team at CSIO-5* in Rotterdam, Netherlands with Unpublished Balme
Ninth place at the Grand Prix World Cup of the CHI-5* in Geneva, Switzerland with Unpublished Balme
 2007
Winner of the Grand Prix at the 1m40 in Cheminot with Melody Burning
Winner of the Grand Prix at the 1m45 in Maillys with Melody Burning
4th in the World Championships of six years in Lanaken, Belgium with Neptune's Cottage
5th in the World Championships of seven years in Lanaken, Belgium with Melody Burning
 2008
Winner of the Grand Prix Pro Elite 1.50m in Sainte-Mere-Eglise with Oda
Winner of the Grand Prix Pro Elite 1.50m in Cluny with Unpublished Balme
Seventh place at the Grand Prix Pro Elite 1.50m in Cluny with Couletto
 2009
Part of the winning team at CSIO-5* in Gijon with Melody Burning
Individual gold medal at the Mediterranean Games in Pescara, Italy with Melody Burning
Part of the gold medal team at the Mediterranean Games in Pescara, Italy with Melody Burning
Seventh place at the Grand Prix for CSI-5* at Paris-Villepinte with Couletto
 2010
Fifth place at the Grand Prix World Cup for CSI-5* in Mechelen, Belgium with Couletto
Winner of the Grand Prix for CSI-3* in Montpellier, France with Oslo du Chavet
Second place at the Grand Prix for CSI-5* in Brussels (Audi Masters) with Couletto
Third place at the Grand Prix for CSI-5* in Paris (Grand Masters) with Napoli du Ry
Winner of the Grand Prix for CSI-4* in Antwerp, Belgium with Napoli du Ry
 2011
Tenth place at the Grand Prix World Cup for CSI-5* in Stuttgart, Germany with Napoli du Ry
Third place at the Grand Prix for CSI-5* in Madrid, Spain with ''Napoli du Ry
Winner of the French Tour EADS at the Global Champions Tour in Cannes with Napoli du Ry
Sixteenth place at the World Cup Final in Leipzig, Germany with Couletto
Fifth place at the Grand Prix World Cup for CSI-5* in Hertogenbosch, Netherlands with Couletto
 2012
Fourth place at the Grand Prix World Cup for CSI-5* in with Napoli du Ry
Twelfth place at the Grand Prix of the Global Champions Tour in Doha, Qatar with Valentino Velvet
Winner of the small Grand Prix for CSIO-5* in La Baule with Whisper
Third place at the Grand Prix for CSIO-5* in Rotterdam, Netherlands with Napoli du Ry
Nineteenth place for the 2012 London Olympics individual jumping with Napoli du Ry
Part of the twelfth place team for the London 2012 Olympics team jumping with Napoli du Ry

Horses

External links

References 

French male equestrians
Olympic equestrians of France
1981 births
Living people
Equestrians at the 2012 Summer Olympics
Sportspeople from Metz
Mediterranean Games gold medalists for France
Mediterranean Games silver medalists for France
Competitors at the 2005 Mediterranean Games
Competitors at the 2009 Mediterranean Games
Mediterranean Games medalists in equestrian
Equestrians at the 2020 Summer Olympics